Padstow, a suburb of local government area City of Canterbury-Bankstown , is located 21 kilometres south-west of the Sydney central business district, in the state of New South Wales, Australia, and is a part of the South-western Sydney region. It is westernmost suburb in the St George area, and the easternmost suburb in Greater Western Sydney, bordering the Southern Sydney region to the east.

Padstow is a mostly residential suburb bounded on the north by Bankstown and on the east by Salt Pan Creek, which is a stream feeding into the Georges River. The M5 South Western Motorway traverses the northern end of the suburb, which is also the location of a number of light industrial facilities.

History

Padstow was first named Padstow Park Estate after the town of Padstow in Cornwall, England. The Cornish Padstow's name means "the holy place of St Petrock" (not to be confused with St Patrick, as they are spelled and pronounced differently), an important Cornish saint. The estate included the grants of Simon McGuigan (130 acres), Joseph Cunningham  and Michael Conroy  . Timber-getting and farming were the main activities here.
The Padstow Park post office opened in 1927 and the first school opened in January 1929. The railway station opened on 21 December 1931, which encouraged development in the area, especially after World War II. The suburb's name was changed to Padstow in 1939.

Commercial area

Padstow shopping centre is located around Padstow railway station. Most of the shops are located on the southern side, around the Howard Road and Padstow Parade intersection, but more shops are located on the northern side past Memorial Drive on Cahors Road.

Street names
A number of the streets in the vicinity of Padstow railway station have Egyptian themes as names, including Arab Road, Cairo Avenue, Pyramid Avenue and Sphinx Avenue. To the west of Padstow, on the border with Revesby there is also a group of streets with outer space related names, such as Uranus Road, Mars Street, Neptune Street, Hydrae Street and Vega Street.

Transport
Padstow railway station is on the Sydney Trains Airport & South Line, west of Riverwood and east of Revesby. There are several bus routes that pass through Padstow, all operated by Transdev NSW. These services developed from routes established by McVicar's Bus Services, which was dissolved in 1978. The 927 travels from One Tree Point (the easternmost tip of Padstow Heights) to Padstow. The 962 travels from Bankstown to Miranda through Padstow, Illawong, Menai and Sutherland. The S5 travels from Milperra to Padstow. Two Metrobus routes travel through Padstow: M91 and M92. M91 travels from Parramatta to Hurstville, via Granville, Chester Hill, Bankstown, Padstow and Peakhurst. M92 travels from Parramatta to Sutherland via Lidcombe, Bankstown, Padstow and Menai.

Demographics
According to the 2016 census, there were 13,306 residents in Padstow. 57.3% of people were born in Australia. The next most common countries of birth were China 7.7%, Vietnam 3.8%, Lebanon 2.4%, India 1.9%, New Zealand 1.7% and Pakistan 0.9%. 50.2% of residents spoke only English at home. Other languages spoken at home included Cantonese 7.4%, Arabic 7.1%, Mandarin 6.4%, Vietnamese 4.6% and Greek 3.8%. The most common responses for religion in Padstow were Catholic 24.0%, No Religion 21.3%, Anglican 12.3% and Eastern Orthodox 7.8%.

Churches
 South West Christian Church
 St Therese Catholic Church
 Padstow Baptist Community Church
 Padstow Congregational Church
 Padstow Chinese Congregational Church
 Lifegate Community Church Padstow
 Padstow Anglican Church
 Padstow Uniting Church

Schools
Padstow has five schools – four public schools and one Catholic school. All are K-6, with students then moving to high-schools in the nearby suburbs of Revesby, Picnic Point, East Hills or Milperra. Padstow North Public School is located on Watson Road, with an access from Halcyon Avenue. Padstow Park Public School is located on Faraday Road but is bounded by Doyle Road and Segers Avenue. Padstow Park Public School gains its title from the original name of the suburb. It is the oldest school in the suburb. The other State owned school, Padstow Heights Public School is on the southern end of Chamberlain Road at Padstow Heights. Padstow Heights Public School is down the road from St Therese Primary School.

St Therese Primary School is on Chamberlain Road but also has an entrance from Harvey Avenue- it is a single-stream primary school which was opened in 1962. The presbytery for the church is also on Harvey Ave.

Caroline Chisholm is a special needs school for students aged 4–18 requiring moderate to high support and provides a challenging and structured educational environment. Caroline Chisholm is in Napoli Street.

Sport
The suburb is home to two junior football (soccer) clubs: Padstow United, whose home ground is Playford Park at the intersection of Gibson, Cahors, Watson and Sphinx Roads, and the Padstow Hornets, who play at Stuart Street Reserve on Stuart Street. In the 1960s, the suburb also supported additional football clubs including the now defunct clubs of Padstow Pirates Soccer Club (later renamed South Bankstown Soccer Club), the Padstow Hotspurs Soccer Club and the Padstow RSL Junior Soccer Football Club.
The Padstow Pirates and South Bankstown Soccer clubs used Playford Park as their home ground. Padstow Park, which is on the corner of Davies Road and Banks Road, is the home ground of the Padstow Panthers Junior Rugby League Club. It was also the home ground of the now defunct St Lukes Junior Rugby League Club and the Padstow RSL Junior Soccer Football Club. Padstow is also home to Doug Frost Swim School, where Ian Thorpe first began swimming.
Padstow Bowling & Recreation Club situated in Iberia Street has two first class synthetic greens and keen supporter of Zone 12 NSW Bowling Association.

Politics
For federal elections, Padstow is located in both the marginal Liberal federal electoral division of Banks which seat is currently held by David Coleman, of the Australian Liberal Party, and the safe Liberal seat of Division of Hughes, previously held by Craig Kelly, who lost the seat after defecting to Clive Palmer's failed party.

For NSW state elections, Padstow is located in the marginal Liberal held state electoral district of East Hills.  As of 2019, this seat is held by Wendy Lindsay.

References

External links

Padstow, Cornwall, UK – Most recent functioning edition from the Internet Archive.

Suburbs of Sydney
City of Canterbury-Bankstown